US-101 may refer to:

 U.S. Route 101
 Lockheed Martin VH-71 Kestrel, U.S. military designation for the AgustaWestland AW101
 WUSY, an FM radio station in Chattanooga, Tennessee

See also
 Interstate 101